The Hazelden Foundation is an American non-profit organization based in Center City, Minnesota. Hazelden has alcohol and drug treatment facilities in Minnesota, Oregon, Illinois, Florida, Washington, and New York. It offers assessment and primary residential addiction treatment for adults and youth, including extended care and intermediate care, as well as outpatient treatment, aftercare services and a family program. In February 2014, it merged with the Betty Ford Center to form the Hazelden Betty Ford Foundation headquartered in Minnesota.

History 
Hazelden began in 1949 as a simple farmhouse retreat called the Old Lodge. It was limited to male alcoholics. The original program designed by Lynne Carroll was based on Alcoholics Anonymous principles, especially the Twelve Steps. In the first 18 months, 156 men were helped. In 1953, the Fellowship Club was established as a halfway house to provide additional help for patients after attending the Center City program. The Dellwood site was later moved to the Center City campus.

Dan Anderson was vice president of Hazelden from 1961 and president between 1971 and 1986.  Mark G. Mishek was named Hazelden President and CEO in August 2008, succeeding Ellen Breyer. Mishek came to Hazelden from Allina Hospitals & Clinics, where he had been President of United Hospital of St. Paul.

In 1999, the Hazelden Graduate School of Addiction Studies opened in Center City, Minnesota.

References

External links 
 
 The Hazelden Graduate School of Addiction Studies

Organizations established in 1949
Mental health organizations in Minnesota
Drug and alcohol rehabilitation centers
1949 establishments in Minnesota
Addiction organizations in the United States